The 2013 Nunavut general election was held October 28, 2013, to elect 22 members to the 4th Legislative Assembly of Nunavut. In November 2012 the assembly passed the Nunavut Elections Act 2012, stating that the writs for election drop September 23, 2013, and an election be held October 28, 2013, the proclamation was registered November 9, 2012. At the 2013 forum, held on November 15, 2013, Peter Taptuna was selected as the new Premier of Nunavut.

Election summary

Redistribution
The number of electoral districts were increased to 22 from 19. This is the first redistribution of boundaries since the territory was created in 1999.

New premier and MLAs
On September 5, 2013, Premier Eva Aariak announced that she would stand for reelection but would not run for the position of premier after the election, paving the way for the 3rd Premier of Nunavut to be chosen. Despite wanting to seek a new position in the Legislature she was defeated in the general election marking the fourth provincial / territorial election in a row that an incumbent Premier has been defeated in his or her riding. (She was preceded by Darrell Dexter in Nova Scotia, Christy Clark in B.C. and Jean Charest in Quebec). A total of seven incumbents did not run for re-election.

In total 73 people registered with Elections Nunavut as candidates. Of these 73 candidates, 12 were incumbents hoping for reelection, and five have been elected in previous territorial elections, four to Nunavut and one to the Legislative Assembly of the Northwest Territories and 56 have not been elected in a territorial election before.

Two ridings were won by acclamation and both of these were returning MLAs. A total of eight ridings were contested solely by candidates who have not been elected in a previous territorial election.

Of the seven incumbent cabinet ministers, two chose not to re-offer, two were defeated (one in a by-election following a tie), and three were reelected (one by acclamation).

Candidates

Following is a list of candidates that had filed with Elections Nunavut by 2:00 pm (local time), September 27, 2013. Bold represents winning candidate. All results from Elections Nunavut.

There were ties in two districts. In Rankin Inlet South, incumbent MLA Lorne Kusugak and challenger Alexander Sammurtok were tied with 172 votes. An official recount was held November 5 and was still found to be a tie. A by-election was scheduled for February 10, 2014, which was won by Sammurtok. In Uqqummiut, Niore Iqalukjuak and Samuel Nuqingaq were tied with 197 votes. After the official recount held November 5 Nuqingaq was found to have two more votes than Iqalukjuak.

Notes
 Igloolik was represented by Louis Tapardjuk (Amittuq)
 Repulse Bay was represented by John Ningark (Akulliq)
 Coral Harbour was represented by Johnny Ningeongan (Nanulik)
 Arviat was represented by Daniel Shewchuk (Arviat)
 Whale Cove was represented by Lorne Kusugak (Rankin Inlet South/Whale Cove)
 Gjoa Haven was represented by Jeannie Ugyuk (Nattilik)
 Iqaluit was represented by Eva Aariak (Iqaluit East), Monica Ell (Iqaluit West) and Hunter Tootoo (Iqaluit Centre)
 Taloyoak was represented by Jeannie Ugyuk (Nattilik)
 Kugaaruk was represented by John Ningark (Akulliq)
 Rankin Inlet was represented by Tagak Curley (Rankin Inlet North) and Lorne Kusugak (Rankin Inlet South/Whale Cove)
 Chesterfield Inlet was represented by Johnny Ningeongan (Nanulik)
 Not running in 2013

Fate of incumbents

Bold indicates a cabinet member.

Retiring incumbents

The following incumbents have announced that they will not be running in the 2013 election.

By-election
With the tie in Rankin Inlet South confirmed by a judicial recount, a new by-election was scheduled on February 10, 2014.

References

External links
Elections Nunavut

2013 elections in Canada
2013
2013 in Nunavut
October 2013 events in Canada